The Ardennais is a draught horse

L'Ardennais, newspaper (fr), part of Robert Hersant group
L'Ardennais (automobile), manufactured in Rethel (Ardennes) from 1901 to around 1903